Lisa Marie Barron is a Canadian politician from British Columbia. She was elected to represent the riding of Nanaimo—Ladysmith in the House of Commons of Canada in the 2021 Canadian federal election. She is a member of the New Democratic Party. Before she won election at the federal level, Barron was a School District 68 Nanaimo-Ladysmith board trustee and an employee of local public schools.

She is out as bisexual, and is a member of the Canadian Pride Caucus, a non-partisan committee of Canada's LGBTQ MPs and senators.

Electoral record

References

External links

21st-century Canadian politicians
21st-century Canadian women politicians
Living people
Year of birth missing (living people)
Members of the House of Commons of Canada from British Columbia
New Democratic Party MPs
Women members of the House of Commons of Canada
Canadian LGBT Members of Parliament
Bisexual politicians
21st-century Canadian LGBT people